The Women's 400m athletics events for the 2016 Summer Paralympics take place at the Estádio Olímpico João Havelange from 8 September to 17 September 2016. A total of 12 events were contested over this distance for 15 different classifications.

Schedule

Medal summary

Results

The following were the results of the finals of each of the Women's 400 metres events in each of the classifications. Further details of each event are available on that event's dedicated page.

T11

17:30 16 September 2016:

T12

18:25 17 September 2016:

T13

10:44 17 September 2016:

T20

17:46 13 September 2016:

T34

17:40 14 September 2016:

T37

10:14 13 September 2016:

T38

11:17 14 September 2016:

T44

18:12 12 September 2016:

T47

18:26 14 September 2016:

T52

11:04 10 September 2016:

T53

17:30 11 September 2016:

T54

17:37 11 September 2016:

References

Athletics at the 2016 Summer Paralympics